The noise level is the level of noise. Specifically, it may refer to:
 Noise (electronics)
 Ambient noise level
 Environmental noise